Gnorimoschema saphirinella is a moth in the family Gelechiidae. It was described by Vactor Tousey Chambers in 1875. It is widespread throughout North America, where it has been recorded from Alabama, Arizona, California, Colorado, Florida, Georgia, Illinois, Kansas, Mississippi, New Mexico, North Dakota, Oklahoma, Tennessee and Texas.

The length of the forewings is 4.5–6 mm for males and 4.2-5.9 mm for females. The forewings range from brown, bronze with a reddish hue, to cinnamon brown, with dark flecks, not forming a distinct pattern. The apex and terminal margin are blackish, sometimes extending along the costa and other veins. The hindwings are usually dark gray. Adults are on wing from February to October.

The larvae feed on Ambrosia chamissonis, Ambrosia confertifolia and Ambrosia psilostachya. They mine the leaves of their host plants.

References

Gnorimoschema
Moths described in 1875